Happiness of Three Women is a 1917 American drama silent film directed by William Desmond Taylor and written by Adele Harris and Albert Payson Terhune. The film stars House Peters, Sr., Myrtle Stedman, Larry Steers, Daisy Jefferson, William Hutchinson and Lucille Ward. The film was released on January 18, 1917, by Paramount Pictures.

Plot

Cast 
House Peters, Sr. as Billy Craig
Myrtle Stedman as Constance Barr
Larry Steers as Mark Barr
Daisy Jefferson as Myrtle Gale
William Hutchinson as Judas Fletcher
Lucille Ward as Mary Fletcher
Milton Brown as Monck

Preservation status
A print of this film survives in the Library of Congress collection, a nitrate positive. An older source indicates that it is incomplete.

References

External links 
 

1917 films
1910s English-language films
Silent American drama films
1917 drama films
Paramount Pictures films
Films directed by William Desmond Taylor
American black-and-white films
American silent feature films
1910s American films